The Tsundur Massacre refers to the killing of several Dalit people in the village of Tsundur, Guntur district, Andhra Pradesh, India, on 6 August 1991. 21-22 Dalits were massacred by Reddy men with the alleged help of the police. When a young graduate Dalit youth was beaten because his feet unintentionally touched a Reddy woman near a cinema hall, the Dalits of the village supported him. As a result, Dalits were socially boycotted by the Reddy landowners of the village. Many Dalits have lost their livelihood as they depend on the daily wages by working in the paddy fields of the Reddys. The significance of this atrocity was Dalits collectively fought to gain legal justice by invoking SC/ST Prevention of Atrocities Act 1989.

Background 
The village of Tsundur was locally dominated by the Reddy peasantry, who were categorized as Shudras but attained notable economic, social, and political power in Andhra following independence. The Reddy community also participated in the anti-Brahmin movement to claim Kshatriya status. Following this post-colonial development, on 7 July 1991, Ravi, a Dalit boy, had accidentally touched a Reddy boy sitting in front of him in a cinema hall with his foot. Ravi apologized immediately, but some Reddy youth roughed him up. Later, Ravi was tracked down, beat up, and forced to drink brandy by some Reddy youth, and the Reddy youth brought Ravi to a police station and demanded that he be arrested for allegedly misbehaving with women while drunk. A parallel incident occurred with another Dalit boy named Rajababu, who was knifed in Tsundur by a certain Krishna Reddy for allegedly grazing his body against two Reddy girls outside a cinema hall, a claim which the Dalit side contests.  Following these two incidents, there were a social boycott of Dalits that lasted a month, which forced them to travel to Tenali to buy basic provisions or Ongole for work. The attacks on the Dalits of Tsundur were carried out to 'teach them a lesson', primarily to try to make them submissive to the local caste Hindus, such as the dominant Reddy peasantry, and comply with their position as 'untouchables'. This position was challenged as Dalit families in the village sought to educate their children so they could be independent of low social status. Dalits had a much higher rate of literacy than the local Reddy community, who were not as interested in educational attainment. It was in this context that the Tsundur Massacre occurred.

Massacre 
On 6 August 1991 at around 11 AM, police forces suddenly entered the homes of Mala Dalit families, causing the Mala men to flee into the fields at the request of their women who were worried about their safety. In those fields, armed Reddy men were waiting and hacked the Dalit men into pieces. Some of the Dalit men were thrown into nearby fields while others were thrown in the river. The police did nothing to stop this massacre, and it was kept hidden for over 24 hours until a Dalit women escaped the village and walked around 40 miles to report it to the district collector in Guntur. After this massacre, the surviving Dalits fled to Tenali, where they were offered refuge by the Salvation Army Church.

Prosecution

212 people were charged in a total of 12 separate cases regarding the incident. 33 defendants subsequently died and the Supreme Court of India then dismissed the charges citing lack of evidence. A Division Bench comprising Justices L. Narasimha Reddy and M.S. Jaiswal turned down the verdict of trial court saying the prosecution had failed to prove the exact time of death, place of occurrence and the identity of attackers.

Bojja Tharakam was senior public prosecutor Tsundur massacre case in the Andhra Pradesh High Court.

References

Further reading
 Police Killings and Rural Violence in Andhra Pradesh
 Brutal Killings of Harijans in Tsundur Village of Guntur District
 Caste, Class and Social Articulation in Andhra Pradesh
 
 
 

Caste-related violence in India
Mass murder in 1991
Conflicts in 1991
Massacres in 1991
1990s in Andhra Pradesh
August 1991 events in Asia
Massacres in India
1991 in India
Crime in Andhra Pradesh
Dalit history